A Roman à thèse (French: 'thesis novel') is a novel which is didactic or which expounds a theory. Scholar Susan Suleiman talked about "authoritarian fiction"

List of romans à thèse 

 Candide by Voltaire
 Sybil by Benjamin Disraeli
 Crime and Punishment by Fyodor Dostoyevsky
 The Plague by Albert Camus
 The Stranger by Albert Camus
 Atlas Shrugged by Ayn Rand
 Runaway Horses by Yukio Mishima

See also 
Bildungsroman
Philosophical fiction
Roman-fleuve

References 

Literary genres